"The Library" is the third segment of the twenty-second episode of the first season (1985–86) of the American television series The Twilight Zone. In this segment, a woman takes a job at a library with books containing the life stories of everyone alive, and finds that she can alter reality by overwriting the text of the books.

Plot
Ellen Pendleton, an aspiring writer, takes a job at a private library. The librarian, Gloria, admits her employer has in fact not given her permission to hire an assistant, but she feels incapable of managing the massive responsibility on her own: the library contains one book for every person alive, with a complete account of their life, accurate to the latest second. When a person dies, that book is removed. No one is allowed to read the books.

While trying to write, Ellen is disturbed by her noisy neighbors, Edwin and Carla, who have just moved into Edwin's apartment from a room downstairs. Using correction fluid and a pen, Ellen rewrites a passage in Edwin's book to make him a Catholic priest, rendering him ineligible to share an apartment with Carla and preventing all their boisterous lovemaking. When Ellen gets home that night, she finds her sister Lori consoling the now-single Carla, who is nearly suicidal from loneliness.

Ellen rewrites Carla's book to make her happily married to another neighbor, Doug. When she gets home, she finds Doug is bankrupt from buying gifts for Carla and regrets not getting into real estate. Ellen changes Doug's book by giving him real estate wealth, but now he is her landlord and her sister is organizing a rent strike.

Ellen rewrites her own book so that she and Lori live in a house by the sea instead. She returns home to find that Lori drowned while rescuing a boy from the ocean. Ellen dashes back to the library and is caught by Gloria, who is incensed when she learns Ellen tampered with the books. She orders Ellen to gather all the books she rewrote and ushers her out of the library. Ellen is met outside by Lori, alive and well. Ellen tries to return to thank Gloria, but the door is answered by a man who claims no one named Gloria is there.

External links
 
 Postcards from the Zone episode 1.55 The Library

1986 American television episodes
The Twilight Zone (1985 TV series season 1) episodes
Television episodes about multiple time paths

fr:On ne vit qu'une fois (La Cinquième Dimension)